Gerard was Count of Auvergne from 839 until his death on 25 June 841.

Marriage and issue
Gerard married either Rotrud or Hildegard, daughters of Louis the Pious. They had the following children:
Ranulf I of Poitiers, Duke of Aquitaine (815–866), married a daughter of Rorgo, Count of Maine
Gerhard II, Count of Limousin (−879)
Unknown daughter

Notes

References

Sources

841 deaths
Nobility of the Carolingian Empire
Year of birth unknown
Counts of Auvergne